Rustico-Emerald is a provincial electoral district for the Legislative Assembly of Prince Edward Island, Canada. It was formerly known as Park Corner-Oyster Bed.

Members
The riding has elected the following Members of the Legislative Assembly:

Election results

Rustico-Emerald, 2007–present

2016 electoral reform plebiscite results

Park Corner-Oyster Bed, 1996–2007

References

 Rustico-Emerald information

Prince Edward Island provincial electoral districts